Satindra Mohan Dev Stadium is a multi-purpose stadium situated at Silchar, Assam. It was earlier known as the District Sports Association  Stadium. After extensive upgrade of facilities, it was renamed after the father of Sri Santosh Mohan Dev. The stadium is used for football and cricket and has a capacity of around 30,000. It has hosted a women's international one day match between Indian and the England women's teams. It also hosted Ranji Trophy as well as Duleep Trophy matches. The floodlights were installed by Bharat Heavy Electrical Limited in 2008. In 2009, cluster matches of Federation Cup Football Tournament held in this stadium.

One-day international matches

This is a list of women's ODI matches hosted at this stadium.

References

External links
 Federation Cup, India - 2008/09 prelims
 The Telegraph, India: Inauguration of flood lit facilities at the stadium
 Cricketarchive

Silchar
Cricket grounds in Assam
Football venues in Assam
Multi-purpose stadiums in India
Sports venues in Assam
Year of establishment missing